Arthur Chambers (September 18, 1903 – February 7, 1928), nicknamed "Rube", was an American Negro league pitcher in the 1920s.

Career
A native of Spartanburg, South Carolina, Chambers attended North Carolina A&T State University.

While still  in college, Chambers was to appear with the Lincoln Giants in 1924, but he failed to report to the team. Instead, he made his Negro leagues debut in 1925 with the Wilmington Potomacs.

When the Potomacs folded in mid-July, Chambers, shortstop Clarence Lindsay and outfielder Pete Washington joined the Lincoln Giants. Chambers went on to play two more seasons with the Giants through 1927. He was struck by a train and killed in West Palm Beach, Florida, on February 7, 1928, at age 24.

References

External links
 and Seamheads

1903 births
1928 deaths
Lincoln Giants players
Wilmington Potomacs players
Baseball pitchers
Baseball players from South Carolina
Sportspeople from Spartanburg, South Carolina
20th-century African-American sportspeople
North Carolina A&T State University alumni
Railway accident deaths in the United States